The Club of Aristocrats (French: Le club des aristocrates) is a 1937 French comedy film directed by Pierre Colombier and starring Jules Berry, Elvire Popesco and André Lefaur. The film's art direction was by Jacques Colombier.

Cast
 Jules Berry as Serge de Montbreuse 
 Elvire Popesco as La comtesse Irène Waldapowska 
 André Lefaur as Le baron de Taillebourg 
 Pierre Larquey as Miser  
 Viviane Romance as Gloriane 
 Fernand Charpin as Bénard  
 Armand Bernard as Alfred  
 Florence Walton as La marquise de Tranchemare  
 Marcel Simon as Le conservateur des Musées nationaux  
 André Roanne as André  
 Lisette Lanvin as Evelyne  
 Jean Tissier as Le secrétaire du club 
 Jacques Beauvais as Le maître d'hôtel 
 Marguerite de Morlaye as Une invitée  
 Liliane Lesaffre as Une invitée  
 Suzy Pierson 
 Hélène Pépée as La soubrette  
 Reda-Caire as Le chanteur  
 Philippe Richard as Le marjordome 
 José Sergy as Edmond

References

Bibliography 
 Parish, James Robert. Film Actors Guide: Western Europe. Scarecrow Press, 1977.

External links 
 

1937 films
French comedy films
1937 comedy films
1930s French-language films
Films directed by Pierre Colombier
Films based on French novels
French black-and-white films
1930s French films